Clark Mathis (sometimes credited as J. Clark Mathis) is an American cinematographer and television director.

As a cinematographer, he photographed a number of notable films. His credits include the Disney Channel original film Gotta Kick It Up! (2002), In the Mix (2005), Rocky Balboa (2006) and Brian Robbins-directed films The Perfect Score (2004), Norbit (2007), Meet Dave (2008) and A Thousand Words (2012), the latter three films starring Eddie Murphy. He also photographed for the television series Cousin Skeeter, The Fugitive, Birds of Prey and Love Bites.
 
He made his directorial debut with the film Bereft (2004), co-directing with actor Tim Daly. Since then he has primarily directed television, directing episodes of The Comeback, One Tree Hill, Blue Mountain State, Supah Ninjas and Grimm.

References

External links

American cinematographers
American film directors
American television directors
Living people
Place of birth missing (living people)
Year of birth missing (living people)